Wikstroemia taiwanensis is a shrub in the family Thymelaeaceae.

Uses
It is known to produce a biflavonoid that shows activity against Mycobacterium tuberculosis.

References

taiwanensis